Sebree is an unincorporated community in Howard County, in the U.S. state of Missouri.

History
A post office called Sebree was established in 1872, and remained in operation until 1899. The community has the name of the local Sebree family.

References

Unincorporated communities in Howard County, Missouri
Unincorporated communities in Missouri